Mark Neville (born 1966) is a British social documentary photographer.

Life and work
Neville studied Fine Arts at Reading University, Berkshire (B.A.), Goldsmiths' College in London (M.A.) and the Rijksakademie in Amsterdam, Netherlands. As an artist he is known for working at the interface of art and documentary utilizing photography and films to capture the unique face of working communities.

Neville is best known for his Port Glasgow Book Project, after he spent a year as artist in residence in Port Glasgow in 2004 portraying the town's hardship of Scotland's post-industrial decline in a photographic book which was distributed as a free gift to all members of the community. He has worked on commissioned projects by The Andy Warhol Museum in Pittsburgh (Braddock/Sewickley, 2012) and Mount Stuart on the Isle of Bute (Fancy Pictures, 2008). His work Deeds Not Words, which addresses the Corby community involved in the toxic waste disposal court case, exhibited in 2013 at The Photographers' Gallery in London. Neville created a body of work based on a three-month residency with the British Army in the Afghan province of Helmand as the UK's official war artist in 2011. Part of The Helmand Work showed at London's Imperial War Museum's Contemporary Art Gallery during its relaunch in Summer 2014. Neville suffered from and was eventually treated for Post Traumatic Stress Disorder upon his return from Helmand, and this experience also resulted in The Battle Against Stigma Book Project. A selection of emails and prints from the book was included in the touring group exhibition With Different Eyes – The Portrait in Contemporary Photography which opened at Die Photographische Sammlung/SK Stiftung Kultur and Kunstmuseum Bonn in 2016, and in Neville’s solo show Battle Against Stigma at QUAD in Derby, England in 2018.

In 2012 The New York Times Magazine commissioned Neville to make the photo essay Here is London, which examined wealth inequality in the capital, and which they subsequently nominated for The Pulitzer Prize. In 2016 Steidl published the first commercially available book on Neville's activist book practice. Fancy Pictures includes work from six of Neville's projects with an interview between David Campany and Neville and was shortlisted for the 2017 Paris Photo–Aperture Foundation PhotoBook Awards PhotoBook of the Year.

Neville’s 2017 project Child’s Play continued his investigation into mental health issues by examining the importance of play in personal development. Neville’s project made a link between the closures of adventure playgrounds in Britain’s urban areas and a drastic rise in cases of depression and anxiety among young people and children.

Begun June 2016 on the day Britain voted to leave the European Union Neville's Parade book project was commissioned by GwinZegal Centre of Art, in the town of Guingamp, France. Disgusted by the outcome of the Brexit vote, Neville decided to examine what community meant in Brittany ('Little Britain’), as a mirror to his own native country.

For many years, Neville lived and worked in London. In October 2020, he moved to Kyiv in the Ukraine.

Awards
2013: Nominated, Pulitzer Prize, by The New York Times Magazine for his photo essay Here Is London
2017: Shortlisted, PhotoBook of the Year, Paris Photo–Aperture Foundation PhotoBook Awards, for his book Fancy Pictures
2018: Shortlisted, Daiwa Foundation Art Prize along with Kate Groobey and Keith Milow
2019: Nominated, Deutsche Börse Photography Foundation Prize 2020, London for his book Parade; also exhibited at The Photographers' Gallery, London. The other nominations were Clare Strand, Mohamed Bourouissa and Anton Kusters.

Publications
Port Glasgow. Self-published, 2004. Edition of 8000 copies.
Deeds Not words. Self-published, 2011. Edition of 500 copies.
London/Pittsburgh. London: Alan Cristea Gallery, 2014. .
Battle Against Stigma. Self-published, 2015. Two volumes; one volume has photographs by Neville and text by Neville and Jamie Hacker Hughes, the other volume contains written testimonies from various soldiers. .
Child's Play. London: Foundling Museum, 2017. . Edition of 500 copies.
Fancy Pictures. Göttingen, Germany: Steidl, 2016. . Includes work from six of Neville's projects. With an interview between David Campany and Neville, "Fancy Pictures".
Parade. Guingamp, France: GwinZegal, 2019. .
Stop Tanks with Books. Nazraeli, 2022. . Photographs by Neville and short stories by Lyuba Yakimchuk. Edited by David Campany.

Notes

References

Further reading

External links

1966 births
Living people
Alumni of the University of Reading
Alumni of Goldsmiths, University of London
Photographers from Yorkshire
British war artists
People of the War in Afghanistan (2001–2021)
Social documentary photographers